Peter J. Greenwood (born 19 October 1962 in Sydney, Australia, died 7 January 2021) was an Australian special effects technician, researcher, designer, voice actor and media consultant.

Married to Gay Lynn Ramey on May 24, 2015 till his passing on 1/7/2021.

He is related to actress Joan Greenwood.

Career

He attended Killara High School in Sydney, NSW.

He began his career as a cel painter with Hanna Barbera Australia at age fifteen, followed by a stint on Sydney radio station 2UW on the Rick Melbourne morning comedy radio show Wood Duck theatre. As a commercial actor he has appeared in minor roles in several Australian TV soap operas. He has worked on various advertising campaigns, and is perhaps best known in Australia as the spokesperson for Matchbox die cast car brand Parasites.

He has also written for magazines published by the Fairfax group, including Omega Science Digest, Woman's Day and TV Soap magazine. He also produced several special-issue magazines for the Howitz group, such as issues focused on Addams Family vs. The Munsters; The Simpsons; Paul Hoga;, and James Dean special. His name appears as "Hollywood editor" on these special editions.

During the 1980s he worked as a licensing designer/consultant for Hanna Barbera Australia, Reg Grundy Productions and Village Roadshow, before moving to Los Angeles, where he worked in the merchandising and promotions field.

In 1992 he was the supervising producer on the American adaptation of the British sci-fi comedy series Red Dwarf, under executive producer Linwood Boomer (creator of Malcolm in the Middle). During 1993 he worked as a costume and special effects technician on an episode of Star Trek: Deep Space Nine and on the movie Teenage Mutant Ninja Turtles III.

Since 2006, Greenwood has been the worldwide licensing manager for Jack Chertok Television, He was recently quoted by the Los Angeles Times regarding his search for and restoration of the Chertok show My Living Doll. Greenwood continues to search for this program in order to issue a second volume in 2013.

He supervised the recent merchandising reactivation of the show My Favorite Martian. His name can be found on the side panel of the Pegasus hobbies kit of Uncle Martin's space ship and the Factory Entertainment Bobble collection.

Consulting to the Milton Canniff estate, he can be found credited in the Hermes Press reprints of the Gold Key Steve Canyon books and the Mail Call art book. In the Hermes Press My Favorite Martian volume one comic reprint, he is listed as the visual editor.

For home video he oversaw the 2012 DVD's extras footage for Alias Smith and Jones, Laramie, Wagon Train, and 87th Precinct.

In 2012 he oversaw the special reprint of a Gold Key My Favorite Martian title together with Hermes Press as part of the Free Comic Book day event across the United States. This was the first 1960s television show to become part of this event.

In 2013 he became the worldwide licensing manager for Anderson Entertainment and has overseen several new products, starting with Gerry Anderson's Dick Spanner.

He is also the driving force behind a new push for the Anderson company to return to puppet production, which was slated begin in 2015 with a new British version of Gerry Anderson's Firestorm, which was previously produced as an anime.

Further credits can be found in Keith Scott's book The Moose That Roared and the recent Brady Bunch history. All of this has made him a sought after consultant for older television projects, and as such can now be found quoted heavily in the third volume of the Star Trek history These Are The Voyages by Marc Cushman.

As an actor, he has voiced a wide range of characters, In his native Australia he was known as a voice over artist for American accented work, having provided tracks for Virgin games and Vitrinox Swiss army knives, the latter of which was nominated for an Australian Cleo award for radio.

On screen he was mostly seen as a baby faced heavy on several soap operas, from The Young Doctors to The Restless Years for the Australian Production company Reg Grundy Productions.

His first US based voice work was on the Art Clokey-produced Gumby adventures remake 1986–87, where he voiced over twenty characters and provided script elements for the Australian themed episode "Kangaroo Express", in which he voiced all the Australian characters. He also created and painted many of the miniature props seen in that episode, as a skilled props maker

The next Australian themed project was Walt Disney's The Rescuers Down Under, where he provided the radio voice and airplane captain and again ad-libbed the first lines of Australian dialogue heard in this film as the Cody character runs past the kitchen as the film begins.

From that point Greenwood has provided looping services for Saban's The Power Rangers, Big Bad Beetleborgs, and Masked Rider.

His laugh and dialogue can be heard on the first installment of the Disney Pirates franchise as crew voices for the Black Pearl.

Credits

TV shows
The Restless Years ... Thug (1979-1980)
Bellamy
"The Axe Man Cometh" (1981) ... Thug
Taurus Rising (1982) ... Grave Digger
Prisoner
Episode 1.524 (1985) ... Photographer
Rafferty's Rules ... Football Thug (1988)
The King of Queens
"Furious Gorge" (2004) ... Support Group Chubby Guy (uncredited)
Lucky Louie
"Kim's O" (2006) ... Tiny the Handyman
"A Mugging Story" (2006) ... Tiny (uncredited)

Voice work
Home (1988) ... Johnny 5 (one episode)
Gumby Adventures (1988) ... Gumby's uncle, cousin, outback man, and others
The Rescuers Down Under (1990) ... Radio Announcer/Airplane Captain
Big Bad Beetleborgs
"Say the Magic Word" (1996) ... Sword Warrior
"Haunted Hideout" (1996) ... Mace Warrior
Power Rangers Turbo
"Cars Attacks" (1997) ... Wolfgang Amadeus Griller (uncredited)
Power Rangers Lightspeed Rescue
"Neptune's Daughter" (2000) ... Aquafiend

References

External links

1962 births
2021 deaths
Australian male television actors
Australian male voice actors
People from Sydney